Guerén (Guêren) is an extinct Botocudoan language of Brazil, related to Krenak. Today, several thousand Guerén people live in Olivença (now a district of Ilhéus), but they no longer speak the language.

References

Krenak languages
Indigenous languages of South America (Central)
Extinct languages of South America
Indigenous languages of Northeastern Brazil